Sebastiano Soracreppa (born 12 September 1999) is an Italian ice hockey player for HC Thurgau and the Italian national team.

He represented Italy at the 2021 IIHF World Championship.

References

External links

1999 births
Living people
HC Alleghe players
SHC Fassa players
HC Thurgau players
Italian expatriate ice hockey people
Italian expatriate sportspeople in Switzerland
Italian ice hockey defencemen
Italian ice hockey forwards
Ice hockey people from Bolzano